The temple of Shree Balaji Mandir is located at Charkop, Kandivali (West). It is claimed to be the second home place of lord venkateshwara after Tirupati Temple.

Every month Moolavar Abhishekam is performed of shree balaji, The abhishekam is performed on Shravana Nakshatra. Lord Shree Balaji is offered arghyam, padhvam, etc. followed by applying scented oil (Attar) on Shree Balaji. Then turmeric paste is applied on Lord Balaji, then the idol is bathed with perfumed water. Meanwhile, Purusha Sukta, Sri Sukta, Bhu Sukta, Shanti Panchakam and brahma Samhita are sung by the priest of our Shree Balaji Temple, Charkop. Then the lord of wealth is dressed up and garlands are offered.

Vaikuntha Ekadashi is the event celebrated at Lord Balaji Temple. Vaikunta Ekadashi is the ekadasi that is observed in the shukla paksha of dhanurmasa as per the Hindu Calendar.

Special Pooja's Performed at Temple.

Abhishekam of Shree Balaji is performed each month on Shravana Nakshatra at Shree Balaji Temple, Mumbai.

During the Abhishekam, the idol of Lord Venkateshwara is offered arghyam, padhvam, etc., followed by the application of scented oil (attar) on Shree Balaji. Next, turmeric paste is applied and the idol is bathed with perfumed water.

Simultaneously, Purusha Sukta, Sri Sukta, Bhu Sukta, Shanti Panchakam and Brahma Samhita are sung by the priests of the temple. The Abhishekam concludes with the Lord being dressed up handsomely along with garlands of fresh flowers.

Festivals

Each year, an auspicious day is announced for the ‘Maha Abhishekam’ of Shree Balaji, which is also known as ‘Panchamrut Snan’.

The ‘Panchamrut Snan’ is the bathing of Shree Balaji’s idol with milk, curd, honey, fruit extracts and flower petals. This event is celebrated with great pomp and on a bigger scale where the entire temple is decorated with flowers and lights. Maha Bhog is offered to the deity on this auspicious occasion.

Vaikuntha Ekadashi

Vaikuntha Ekadashi is celebrated in the month of Margashirsha. It is believed that the doors of Vaikuntha are open on this day, hence drawing thousands of devotees to the temple to seek the blessings of Shree Balaji. A special bhog is offered to the deity on this auspicious occasion and the aarti taken on this day is known to be a special blessing.

[Dhanurmas] Festival is also celebrated in the month of Margashirsha, in memory of a story from ancient times.

It is believed that Sri Andal, the adopted daughter of Sri Periyalwar, one of the most revered saints in Hinduism, was dedicated to Lord Vishnu to the extent that she decided to marry the Lord Himself. She would offer archana to the Lord in order to achieve her ultimate purpose in life. Sri Andal is regarded to be the form of Goddess Mahalaxmi.

During her Dhanurmas Vrat, she composed numerous spiritual versus, which is popularly known as ‘Tiruppavai’. On Poornima (full moon) of Margashish, she finally wedded the Supreme Lord Vishnu, also known as Lord Shrinivasa.

At Shree Balaji Temple in Charkop, Mumbai, we celebrate each day of Margashirsha by worshipping Sri Andal and Shree Balaji with one verse every day of ‘Tiruppavai’sung by the bhajan mandali of the temple. Also, on all these days, Pongal Bhog is offered to the Lord and then the prasadam from the bhog is distributed amongst devotees. The last day of the Margashirsha month, which is the day of Poornima and also the wedding day of Sri Andal and Shree Balaji, is celebrated with special decorations in the temple along with a Maha Aarti to mark this occasion.

Archana

Archana is a special pooja carried out by the temple priest. It is usually performed by narrating the name of the devotee, his birth star and family ancestry to call upon direct guidance and blessings of the Lord. The foremost part of the pooja, however, is chanting 16, 108 or 1008 names of the deity and worshipping the Lord with tulsi leaves, flowers and kumkum.

Kalyan Mala

Kalyan Mala is a holy thread (Andal Mala) offered to Shree Balaji to invoke the blessings of the Lord for a long and happy married life in case of married couples and to seek an ideal life partner and a happy future, if looking to get wedded.

Tulsi Mala

Tulsi (basil) is known to be the most sacred plant in Hinduism. It is worshipped for its healing powers. It is said that by offering a Tulsi Mala (garland of tulsi leaves) to Lord Venkateshwara, the aura of the devotee is purified and he can connect to Shree Balaji, hence, bringing peace, good health and wards off the evil.

Oil Offering

Oil is generally offered to Lord Venkateshwara to eliminate the darkness form the minds of the devotee and ask the Lord to guide him through the path of knowledge and shower him with enough wisdom to lead a life of humbleness.

Unjal (swing) Seva

This pooja is performed on Saturdays at the Shree Balaji Temple, Mumbai. The Utsav deities are decorated beautifully and placed on a swing for this pooja and worshipped by swinging it back and forth. Just like the swing, our lives are filled with ups and downs and Unjal Seva is performed to bring about balance in our lives and bless us with tolerance.

Pitru Daan / Annadanam

As per ancient Hindu Texts, the souls of our departed ancestors dwell within the bodies of the Brahmans and any offerings made to the Brahmans, be it food or clothes, will satisfy our ancestors and thus, the Gods. Devotees opting for Pitru Daan are known to get devoid of all sins and hence, attain salvation. These devotees are blessed with fame prosperity, long and healthy life and fine children.

Vastra Daanam (Offering clothes to the Lord)

It is known that offering clothes to Lord Venkateshwara at Shree Balaji Temple, Mumbai will bring abundance and peace of mind and body to the devotee. He will be blessed by Lord Venkateshwara and his physical health will be cared by the Lord himself.

Prasadam (Naivedyam)

Prasadam means gift, mostly in the form of sweets, prepared with a lot of devotion. By offering Prasadam to Lord Venkateshwara, devotees are blessed with good health, endurance, prosperity and abundance. Prasadam is first offered to the Lord and then distributed amongst devotees, which is believed to ease their sins and sorrows.

Deepotsava Seva (Deepalankara)

Deepotsava Seva means lighting a lamp for Shree Balaji at the temple. By doing this seva, the devotee receives anugraha (blessings) of Lord Venkateshwara in the form of Gyan Drishti (clear vision of knowledge). Light a lamp at Shree Balaji temple with utmost devotion, love and a pure heart. In turn all the darkness and sorrows of your life will transform to a bright and prosperous future.

Offering Til (Sesame) Pudi

Problems related to the planetary positions of Rahu, Ketu and Shani or Sade-Sathi in one’s kundali or horoscope is known to be pacified by the burning of Til (sesame) Oil or sesame seeds soaked in oil. Scientifically, when the aroma of burnt sesame oil is inhaled, it opens up various knots in our veins and enhances the circulation of blood in the body, hence, refreshing the mind. The air is purified, making connection with the Lord, an easier process.

Tulabharam (Weighing in a scale)

Tulabharam means offering an ingredient required, at Shree Balaji Temple, to prepare Prasadam equivalent to one’s weight. It signifies surrendering oneself completely, with a pure heart, to Lord Venkateshwara. The ingredient offered is used towards Annadanam,  Prasadam, and feeding of the poor, which gratifies the devotee and gives him immense peace of mind.

Suprabhata Seva

Suprabhata (auspicious dawn) Seva is performed by chanting Suprabhatam at Shree Balaji Temple and offering Lord Venkateswara with the first aarti and bhog of the day. This seva is said to bring in dawns of good fortune and excellence and bestows the devotee with inner strength to withstand any difficulty he faces in his life.

Nitya Seva (Daily pooja)

Performing Aarti to Lord Venkateshwara at Shree Balaji Temple and distributing Prasadam twice a day with utmost devotion is Nitya Seva. It shows the devotee’s faith in the Lord and he stands blessed with prosperity and good health.
Bhajan Yajman

 After the bhajans each day, except for Sundays, a special pooja is performed on behalf of a couple of devotees present at that moment, having birthdays or anniversaries on that day. The significance of this pooja is to assure overall health, happiness and prosperity of these devotees.
Udayasthamana Pooja

This seva involves devotedly worshipping Lord Venkateshwara at Shree Balaji Temple right from the morning aarti to the last pooja at night by the devotee (all alankarams, vastrams, archana, bhog, deeparadhana, flower and tulsi offerings). By offering this seva to the Lord, the devotee is relieved of all the sins and sufferings surrounding his life and is blessed with a bright future, good health and great prosperity all round.

Significance of Mumbai Shree Balaji Swarna Mandir

As per Vedas, Hindu Temple is a miniature cosmos. It is the house of God. Temple represents the earthly world, the heavenly world and the astral world. Temple is a cradle of knowledge and reality and empowers the devotee by resolving all his delusions. This is the place where devotees realizes the truth and gets transformed.
Padapadmam

Believers claim that the temple is built considering the shilpa shashtra, agama shashtra and vastu shashtra becomes the wish full-filler one. Devotees arrive here to fulfill their wishes and to be blessed.

Location
It is located at around 5 km from kandivali(west)near Charkop sec 7.
Shree Balaji Mandir 3-289, Road No. RSC 69, Sector 7, Opp. Priyadarshani School, Charkop, Kandivali(West), Mumbai, India 400067
Landmark:- Beside Charkop Depot.

External links
 http://www.shreebalajimandir.org
 http://www.speakingtree.in/public/shreebalaji
 https://www.youtube.com/shreebalajimandir YouTube Profile

Hindu temples in Mumbai